Souse may refer to:

Head cheese, a terrine usually made from the head of a pig or calf and set in aspic
A food that has been pickled
A habitual drunkard

See also
Sousse, a city in Tunisia
Soused (disambiguation)